Ted Weng Edward Louis (born July 17, 1982 in Kurra Falls) is a Nigerian football player. , he played for Plateau United F.C. of Jos.

Early career
Hails from Kurra Falls in the Barkin Ladi local government area of Plateau State. He is otherwise known as ‘Ze Roberto'.

Career
He started his professional career with the Mighty Jets of Jos (1998–1999). He has played for BCC Lions FC of Gboko (1999), Niger Tornadoes F.C. of Minna (2000–2002), El-Kanemi Warriors FC of Maiduguri (2002–2004), Plateau United F.C. of Jos (2004) and Kwara United F.C. of Ilorin (2005). He played for the El-Kanemi Warriors of Maiduguri from 2010–2012, where he participated in the quarter-finals of the 2012 Federation Cup. Later in 2012, Weng became a free agent and returned to Plateau United.

Titles
Weng was a National Challenge FA Cup winner with Niger Tornadoes F.C. in 2000, played in the West African Football Union (WAFU) Cup in 2000 and in the African Cup Winners (Mandela) Cup in 2001 with Niger Tornadoes.

References

1982 births
Living people
Nigerian footballers
Association football midfielders
Mighty Jets F.C. players
Plateau United F.C. players
El-Kanemi Warriors F.C. players
Kwara United F.C. players
Niger Tornadoes F.C. players
BCC Lions F.C. players
Sportspeople from Plateau State